Bennett "Benny" Marshall (November 6, 1919 - September 25, 1969) was a ten-time winner of the Alabama Sportswriter of the Year from the National Sportscasters and Sportswriters Association. He is considered the top sports writer in Alabama newspaper history. He became sports editor of The Birmingham News in 1959, replacing Zip Newman, and won numerous state and national awards. His son, Phillip Marshall, was a sports writer for The Huntsville News, The Birmingham Post-Herald, The Huntsville Times and sports editor of The Montgomery Advertiser. Three other children - David, Ellen and Matt - are no longer living. Marshall died on September 25, 1969, from a self-inflicted gunshot. He was 49.

Benny Marshall wrote a sports column for The Birmingham News. Amongst the variety of his writing styles, one particular style stood out from the rest. He could tell a story in his column in a way that touched people. Fifty years later, there are still some who can remember a Benny Marshall story bringing tears their [then] young eyes. Marshall covered the top football games played by the state's two major universities. He was a dutiful reporter of the facts and the big plays, an entirely different style than he used in many of his columns. Sometimes he would simply report independent factoids that were disconnected. The title on those columns was, "Noted in passing...". Other times, Marshall might have identified a sports story that had heart. When he was inspired, he could make that story come alive with the brief touching tapestry he weaved with his well chosen words. Marshall's talent for capturing the depth and character of humanity as played out in a sports story endeared him to sports lovers throughout the state.

References

1919 births
1969 deaths
American male journalists
Writers from Birmingham, Alabama
20th-century American writers
Journalists from Alabama
20th-century American journalists
20th-century American male writers
1969 suicides
Suicides by firearm in Alabama